The 2002 NCAA Division II Men's Soccer Championship was the 31st annual tournament held by the NCAA to determine the top men's Division II college soccer program in the United States.

On the strength of three 2nd half goals Sonoma State (19-3-1) defeated Southern New Hampshire in the tournament final, 4–3.

This was the first national title for the Seawolves, who were coached by Marcus Ziemer. Sonoma State had previously been College Cup finalists in 1991.

Bracket

Final

See also  
 NCAA Division I Men's Soccer Championship
 NCAA Division III Men's Soccer Championship
 NAIA Men's Soccer Championship

References 

|CAA Division II Men's Soccer Championship
NCAA Division II Men's Soccer Championship
NCAA Division II Men's Soccer Championship
NCAA Division II Men's Soccer Championship
Sonoma State Seawolves men's soccer